These are the results for the mixed doubles event at the 2018 Summer Youth Olympics.

Seeds

Main draw

Finals

Top half

Bottom half

References 
 Draw

Mixed doubles